A general election was held on 15 October 2014 to elect 90 members of the Haryana Legislative Assembly. The term of previous assembly elected in 2009 was to expire on 27 October 2014. The results were announced on 19 October. The BJP won the majority in the Assembly. Manohar Lal Khattar was chosen to head the new government.

Parties contending
Four major parties contested the election - the Indian National Congress (INC, incumbent), the Indian National Lok Dal (INLD), the Bharatiya Janata Party (BJP) and the Haryana Janhit Congress (HJC). Others that contested the elections included candidates from the Bahujan Samaj Party, Communist Party of India, Communist Party of India (Marxist), Samajwadi Party, Shiromani Akali Dal (an alliance partner of BJP in neighbouring Punjab ), other regional parties and independents.

Date
The Election Commission of India announced, on 12 September 2014, Haryana's Legislative Assembly election under Article 324 and 172(1) of the Constitution of India and Section 15 of Representation of the People Act, 1951. The announcement stated 90 assembly seats to be contested, of which 17 constituencies were reserved for Scheduled Castes candidates.

Election
Voting was held on 15 October and the result was announced four days later. Voter turnout for the Assembly election set a new state record with 76.54%. A total of 1,351 candidates, of which 116 were women, contested for the 90 seats (an average of 15 candidates per seat). This was the highest number of total and women candidates in Haryana assembly elections since its formation in 1966.

Voter-verified paper audit trail (VVPAT) was used along with EVMs in 6 out of 90 assembly constituencies in Haryana-Thanesar, Karnal, Panipat city, Sonipat, Rohtak and Gurgaon.

Among other practices to ensure a fair election, photo electoral rolls and photo identification were mandatory during the election. Each polling booth was provided with multiple Awareness Observers as non-participating members to verify free and fair voting and access. Every polling station was also equipped with basic minimum facilities such as access to drinking water, toilet and a ramp for the disabled. The voters cast their vote at 16,244 polling booths. The poll was conducted using electronic voting machines.

Exit polls

Result

The BJP won a majority with 47 seats. With BJP's alliance partner Shiromani Akali Dal (SAD), which won 1 seat, the NDA alliance of BJP and SAD won 48 seats.

Results by constituency

Source:

Government formation
The BJP was scheduled to meet on 21 October to choose a chief minister; a swearing-in ceremony was expected before Diwali on 23 October. The BJP parliamentary board deputed Venkaiah Naidu and Dinesh Sharma as observers for the meeting. Leading contenders for the post were Rashtriya Swayamsewak Sangh activist Manohar Lal Khattar, Haryana BJP president Ram Bilas Sharma, BJP spokesperson Captain Abhimanyu, MP Krishan Pal Gurjar, MLA Anil Vij and BJP Kisan cell leader O. P. Dhankar. Khattar was speculated to be leading the race. Khattar was then chosen to head the new government and was sworn in on 26 October.

References

2014
2014
2014 State Assembly elections in India
April 2014 events in India